The 1889–90 Northern Football League season was the inaugural season in the history of the Northern Football League, a football competition in Northern England.

Clubs

The league featured 10 clubs.

League table

References

1889-90
3